Nailab is a Kenyan startup incubator, located in Nairobi,  that was founded in 2010 by Tonee Ndungu and Bart Lacroix. In 2012 Tonee Ndungu left to found Kytabu, and EdTech company based in Nairobi, Kenya. The company incubates technology-based companies and offers 3–6 months entrepreneurship programs with a focus on growing innovative technology driven ideas.

Nailab tries to lower the entry barriers for ICT entrepreneurs who want to start and scale their businesses in Kenya. Nailab was launched in 2011 by Nailab Ltd in partnership with the crowdfunding platform 1%CLUB.

Initial funding for Nailab came from angels Sam Gichuru, Bart Lacroix and Anna Chojnakha. It was later directly funded by 1%Club.

Already, a few startups have graduated from the Nailab, including Tusqee, a mobile app that allows schools to send children's grades to their parents by SMS, KejaHunt, an online house hunting platform that helps the low and middle income earners find affordable housing and MyOrder, an app that allow street vendors to open their own mobile web shop, allowing customers to order and pay by mobile phone.

Nailab Secured a $1.6 Million Tech Incubation project from the Government of Kenya, the initiative of the Ministry of Information and Communications through the World Bank. It is funded by the Kenya Transparency and Infrastructure Project which was spearheaded by the Kenya ICT Board (KICTB).

See also
IHub

References 

 http://www.independent.co.ug/rwanda-ed/rwanda/6584-nurturing-innovative-entrepreneurship
 http://tusqee.com/blog/?tag=sam-gichuru
 http://www.businessdailyafrica.com/New+incubation+centre+to+focus+on+social+media+apps/-/539444/1131626/-/item/0/-/s2110wz/-/index.html
 http://edgie.een.nl/2012/11/modern-heroes-1/

External links 
 Incubator opens its doors
 NAILAB: East Africa's Incubation Space
 The Nailab - The Nailab Website
 Sam Gichuru's Website - Sam Gichuru's Official Website
 Video - Sam tells the story of his life
 Sam Gichuru: Kenya Dubbed the Silicon Savanna - http://www.abndigital.com/page/multimedia/video/closing-bell/1487374-Kenya-Dubbed-the-Silicon-Savanna
 Nailab - https://www.forbes.com/sites/mfonobongnsehe/2013/01/24/1-6-million-tech-incubation-program-launched-in-kenya/

Business incubators
Organisations based in Nairobi
Science and technology in Kenya